The 14715/14716 Shri Ganganagar – Sikar Express is an express train belonging to North Western Railway zone of Indian Railways that run between  and  of Rajasthan state in India.

Background

This train was inaugurated on 10 February 2019, from Shri Ganganagar flagged off by Nihalchand, MP of Shri Ganganagar for more connectivity between Shri Ganganagar and Sikar.

Service

Frequency of this train is tri-weekly and it covers the distance of 393 km with an average speed of 49 km/h on both sides.

Route and halts

The important halts of the train are:

Schedule

Traction

As the route is going to be electrified an WDM-3D loco pulls the train to its destination on both sides.

External links
 14715/Shri Ganganagar - Sikar Express
 14716/Sikar - Shri Ganganagar Express

References

Rail transport in Rajasthan
Transport in Sri Ganganagar
Express trains in India
Railway services introduced in 2019
Sikar district